Hans Kockelmans (born February 20, 1956) is a Dutch composer, teacher, and performer of Early Classical and electronic music.

He studied baroque lute with Mijndert Jape, as well as electronic music, and classical guitar at the Maastricht conservatory.

In his compositions he is a pioneer of granular synthesis. His electronic music as well as his acoustic work frequently refers to medieval themes. He composes for such unusual instruments as Phantastron.

He has collaborated with Roman Turovsky on a number of experimental compositions involving lute and torban.

Hans is a nephew of Dutch composer Gerard Kockelmans. He lives in Maastricht and is active in an organization of composers in his region, Dutch Limburg.

References

External links
 Official website
 Limburg Composers

Living people
20th-century classical composers
21st-century classical composers
Composers for carillon
Composers for theremin
Dutch classical guitarists
Dutch male guitarists
Dutch male classical composers
Dutch classical composers
People from Limburg (Netherlands)
Musicians from Maastricht
Place of birth missing (living people)
20th-century guitarists
21st-century guitarists
1956 births
20th-century Dutch male musicians
21st-century male musicians